The Great Comet of 1843, formally designated C/1843 D1 and 1843 I, was a long-period comet which became very bright in March 1843 (it is also known as the Great March Comet). It was discovered on February 5, 1843, and rapidly brightened to become a great comet. It was a member of the Kreutz Sungrazers, a family of comets resulting from the breakup of a parent comet (X/1106 C1) into multiple fragments in about 1106. These comets pass extremely close to the surface of the Sun—within a few solar radii—and often become very bright as a result.

Perihelion
First observed in early February, 1843, it raced toward an incredibly close perihelion of less than 830,000 km on February 27, 1843; at this time it was observed in broad daylight roughly a degree away from the Sun.  It passed closest to Earth on March 6, 1843, and was at its greatest brilliance the following day; unfortunately for observers north of the equator, at its peak it was best visible from the Southern Hemisphere. It was last observed on April 19, 1843.  At that time this comet had passed closer to the Sun than any other known object.

Tail

The Great Comet of 1843 developed an extremely long tail during and after its perihelion passage. At over two astronomical units in length, it was the longest known cometary tail until measurements in 1996 showed that Comet Hyakutake's tail was almost twice as long. There is a painting in the National Maritime Museum that was created by astronomer Charles Piazzi Smyth with the purpose of showing the overall brightness and size of the tail of the comet.

Orbit
Estimates for the orbital period of the comet have varied from 512 ± 105 years (Kreutz's classical work from 1901), 654 ± 103 years (Chodas2008 unforced solution), 688 years (JPL Horizons barycentric epoch 1852 solution), and 742 years (Chodas2008 forced solution based on a presumed identity with X/1106 C1). But the comet was only observed over a period of 45 days from March 5 to April 19, and the uncertainties mean it likely has an orbital period of 600 to 800 years.

Musical depiction
The Mexican composer Luis Baca composed a waltz for piano, El cometa de 1843.  It appeared as no. 13 in Instructor filarmónico, periódico semanario musical, Tomo primero (Mexico, 1843)

See also
Charles Piazzi Smyth

References

External links 

"Der Komet" in Illustrite Zeitung, 1843 (German with 1 drawing)

Orlon Petterson, "Great Comets in History" (Accessed 2/7/06)
Donald Yeomans, "Great Comets in History" (Accessed 7/21/08)
C/1843 D1 (Great March Comet), cometography.com
"Saw a comet star ablazing..." Log of the New Bedford whaling ship Washington, March 6, 1843, Nantucket Historical Association
Instructor filarmónico, periòdico semanario musical, Tomo primero, page 53; digitized by the Gaylord Music Library, Washington University in St. Louis

Periodic comets
Kreutz Sungrazers
18430205
Great comets